Peter Bouschen (born 16 May 1960 in Düsseldorf) is a retired West German triple jumper.

His personal best jump was 17.43 metres, achieved in June 1988 in Düsseldorf. This result places him fifth on the German all-time list, behind Ralf Jaros, Charles Friedek, Volker Mai and Dirk Gamlin.

He became West German champion in 1981, 1983, 1986 and 1987 and West German indoor champion in 1981 and 1987. He represented the club DJK Agon 08 Düsseldorf.

Achievements

References

1960 births
Living people
German male triple jumpers
West German male triple jumpers
Athletes (track and field) at the 1984 Summer Olympics
Olympic athletes of West Germany
World Athletics Championships athletes for West Germany
DJK Agon 08 Düsseldorf athletes
Sportspeople from Düsseldorf